Deysel is a surname. Notable people with the surname include:

Deshun Deysel (born 1970), South African mountaineer and businesswoman
Jean Deysel (born 1985), South African rugby union player
Johan Deysel (born 1991), Namibian rugby union player